The member churches of the United Apostolic Church are independent communities in the tradition of the catholic apostolic revival movement.

Further reading
 Apostolic Church of Queensland, Book of faith
 Wissen, Volker: Zur Freiheit berufen - Ein Portrait der Vereinigung Apostolischer Gemeinden und ihrer Gliedkirchen, Remscheid 2008 -

External links
 www.united-apostolic.org United Apostolic Church Europe (UAC)

Catholic Apostolic Church denominations
Christian organizations